Punk Goes Pop Volume 5 is the thirteenth compilation album in the Punk Goes... series created by Fearless Records and the fifth installment in the Punk Goes Pop series to contain bands covering mainstream pop music. It was released on November 6, 2012 through Fearless Records. The album debuted at number sixteen on the Billboard 200, selling more than 21,000 copies within its first week. The album spawned three singles to date. The first single off the album was Memphis May Fire's cover of Grenade by Bruno Mars, which was released on October 2, 2012. The album's second single off the album was Mayday Parade's cover of Somebody That I Used to Know by Gotye featuring New Zealand artist Kimbra, which also featured guest vocals by Vic Fuentes of the band Pierce The Veil, it sold more than 15,000 copies within the album's first week of release, debuting at numbers eighteen and nineteen on the Billboard Rock Songs and Heatseekers Songs charts, respectively., it was released on October 16, 2012. The third single off the album was SECRETS cover of Ass Back Home by Gym Class Heroes featuring English artist Neon Hitch, which was released on December 12, 2012.

Additionally Japan's edition contains a second CD featuring Japanese bands covering American pop songs.

Track listing

Sampler Track listing
Punk Goes Pop Volume 5 also included a bonus sampler CD featuring 11 previously released songs by bands from the Fearless Records label.

Punk Goes Pop Volume 5 (Japanese Edition)
Additionally Punk Goes Pop Volume 5 was released in Japan with a bonus CD containing 9 songs by Japanese bands Noisemaker, New Breed, Lost, Ashley Scared The Sky, Her Name In Blood, Secret-Line, The Game Shop, Your Last Diary, and Fake Face covering mainstream Pop songs by artists such as Rihanna, Ne-Yo, Daft Punk, and Owl City & Carly Rae Jepsen.

Track listing
The Japanese Edition included a second CD with the following bonus tracks.

Charts and release history
Charts

Releases

References

Covers albums
Punk Goes series
2012 compilation albums